LaKeith Lee Stanfield (born August 12, 1991) is an American actor and musician. He made his feature film debut in Short Term 12 (2013), for which he was nominated for an Independent Spirit Award. He received further recognition for his roles in the films Selma (2014), Straight Outta Compton (2015), Crown Heights (2017), Sorry to Bother You (2018), and Judas and the Black Messiah (2021), the lattermost of which earned him a nomination for the Academy Award for Best Supporting Actor.

Stanfield has also appeared in the films Dope (2015), Get Out (2017), Uncut Gems (2019), Knives Out (2019), The Photograph (2020) and The Harder They Fall (2021), and starred in the series Atlanta (2016–2022), for which he won a Black Reel Award for Television. He has also been nominated for a Critics' Choice Movie Award, a Gotham Award, two Satellite Awards, two Screen Actors Guild Awards, and five Black Reel Awards.

Early life
LaKeith Lee Stanfield was born in San Bernardino, California, on August 12, 1991, and grew up in Riverside and Victorville. His mother's name is Karen. He has said that he "grew up very poor in a fractured family that was dysfunctional on both sides". He decided to become an actor when he was 14 after joining his high school's drama club. He attended the John Casablancas Modeling and Career Center in Los Angeles, where he was signed by an agency and began auditioning for commercials.

Career
Stanfield's first acting role was in the short film Short Term 12, Destin Daniel Cretton's thesis project at San Diego State University, which won the Jury Award for U.S. Short Filmmaking at the 2009 Sundance Film Festival. A year later, he appeared in the short film Gimme Grace (2010). While continuing to keep his dreams of acting alive, he went on to work a number of different jobs such as roofing and gardening, and jobs at AT&T and a legal marijuana dispensary, before he was contacted by Cretton to reappear in a feature-length adaptation of Short Term 12. It was his first feature film role. During production, Stanfield practiced method acting, distancing himself from the other cast members like his character. He was the only actor to appear in both the short and feature versions. The film won the Grand Jury Prize for Best Narrative Feature at the 2013 South by Southwest film festival, and Stanfield was nominated for the Independent Spirit Award for Best Supporting Male.

In 2014, Stanfield co-starred in The Purge: Anarchy and Selma, in the latter playing civil rights activist Jimmie Lee Jackson. In 2015, he appeared in the films Memoria and Miles Ahead. He also starred in the fantasy horror thriller film King Ripple by filmmaker Luke Jaden, and appeared in the music video for the Run the Jewels song "Close Your Eyes (And Count to Fuck)". In 2015, he portrayed rapper Snoop Dogg in the biopic Straight Outta Compton. In 2017, he played L in Adam Wingard's adaptation of the popular Japanese fantasy-thriller manga series Death Note, for Netflix. Also that year, he starred in the music video for the song "Cold Little Heart" by English singer Michael Kiwanuka, and appeared in the critically acclaimed horror film Get Out. In 2018, he starred as Cassius "Cash" Green in the critically acclaimed dark comedy film Sorry to Bother You.

In 2019, Stanfield starred as Nate Davis in the Netflix romantic comedy film Someone Great. In the same year, he played Lieutenant Elliot in the mystery film Knives Out. He had starring roles in the films The Photograph (2020) and Judas and the Black Messiah (2021). His portrayal of FBI informant William O'Neal in the latter was critically acclaimed and garnered him a nomination for the Academy Award for Best Supporting Actor.

Music career 
Stanfield performs under the stage name Htiekal and is working on his debut album, titled Self Control. He is a member of the band Moors, with Hrishikesh Hirway of Song Exploder.

Personal life 
Stanfield has a daughter with actress Xosha Roquemore, born June 2017. He also has a daughter named Apollo with artist 730t. He lives in Pasadena. In December of 2022, Stanfield became engaged to model Kasmere Trice.

Accusations of anti-Semitism 
In 2021, Stanfield participated in a Clubhouse room centered on the teachings of Louis Farrakhan and anti-Semitic conspiracy theories. According to Indiewire, Stanfield previously issued an apology on Instagram for his role in the conversation, but deleted the post not long after. "Yesterday I entered an online chat room on Clubhouse about the teachings of Louis Farrakhan. When the room's participants noticed me, I was quickly made a moderator of this room", Stanfield wrote. "At some point during the dialogue the discussion took a very negative turn when several users made abhorrent anti-Semitic statements and at that point, I should have either shut down the discussion or removed myself from it entirely."

Filmography

Film

Television

Music videos

Awards and nominations

References

External links
 
 
 

1991 births
21st-century American male actors
African-American male actors
American male film actors
American male stage actors
American male voice actors
Living people
Male actors from Riverside, California
Musicians from San Bernardino, California
People from Victorville, California
21st-century African-American people